"If This Is Love" is a song written by Kerry Chater and Robbie Patton which was recorded by Joey Travolta for his 1978 debut album Joey Travolta. The album's advance single: "I Don't Wanna Go", had been issued in May 1978 and had approached the Top 40 of the Billboard Hot 100 but ultimately stalled at #43. Issued as a single concurrently with its parent album's release in September 1978, "If This is Love" would not accrue enough popularity to reach the Hot 100: it did spend six weeks in the 101-150 Singles chart in Record World magazine rising as high as #115.

The song had earlier been recorded by  Tom Jones for his 1977 album What a Night (1977), with another 1978 recording being made by Peter Pringle. "If This is Love" was subsequently recorded by Randy Edelman for his 1979 album You're the One from which it was issued as a single, by Glen Campbell - with Tanya Tucker as background vocalist - for his 1980 album Somethin' 'Bout You Baby I Like, Melissa Manchester for her 1980 album For the Working Girl, and by Nigel Olsson for his 1980 album Changing Tides (1980). The Melissa Manchester version was issued as its album's first single release and became a Top 20 Adult Contemporary hit also reaching #102 on the Bubbling Under Hot 100 in Billboard (while failing to register on the 101-150 Singles chart in Record World).

References

1978 songs
1978 singles
Songs written by Robbie Patton
Songs written by Kerry Chater